The Eastman memos, also known as the "coup memo", are documents by John Eastman, an American law professor retained by then-President Donald Trump advancing the fringe legal theory that the U.S. Vice President has unilateral authority to reject certified State electors which would have the effect of nullifying an election in order to produce an outcome desired by the Vice President, such as a result in the Vice President's own party's favor.

Trump and Eastman used the memos in an unsuccessful campaign to pressure then vice president Mike Pence into preventing or nullifying the 2021 United States Electoral College vote count, and eventually overturning the 2020 United States election of Joe Biden, so that Trump could retain power.

The Trump campaign engaged Eastman with a formal retainer agreement signed December 5 for services in litigating the election outcome. The memos have been described as an instruction manual for a coup d'état.

Overview 
After the 2020 United States presidential election in which Joe Biden prevailed, then-incumbent Donald Trump, as well as his campaign, his proxies, and many of his supporters, pursued an aggressive and unprecedented effort
to deny and overturn the election by means of a legalistic soft coup (or self-coup).

In late December 2020, Trump and some of his supporters, such as former National Security Adviser Michael Flynn, began to promote the idea of the Pence Card, a legal theory by which then-Vice President Mike Pence had unilateral authority to reject electoral votes from states deemed to be fraudulent. The theory originated with a two-page proposal tweeted to Trump by Flynn associate Ivan Raiklin on December 22.

In that context, John C. Eastman tried to convince then-Vice President Mike Pence that he could overturn the election results on January 6, 2021 (when Congress counted the Electoral College votes) by throwing out electors from "7 states" – presumably Arizona, Georgia, Michigan, Nevada, Pennsylvania, and Wisconsin, along with either New Mexico or the federal district Washington, D.C. Slates of electors declaring Trump the winner actually were submitted from the seven states, but the National Archives did not accept the unsanctioned documents and they did not explicitly enter the deliberations. Under Eastman's scheme, Pence would have declared Trump the winner with more Electoral College votes after the seven states were thrown out, at 232 votes to 222.

According to a news report in The Washington Post on October 23, 2021, the Willard Hotel was a "command center" for the White House plot, that included Eastman, to overturn the results of the 2020 election. According to The Guardian, Eastman was part of a legal team at the Willard that Trump called the night before the January 6 attack on the Capitol and asked them to find ways to stop Biden's certification the next day. Further related details of the effort to deny and overturn the election have been reported, including a meeting between election deniers and Trump administration official Robert Destro at the State Department on January 6. Also, in October 2021, Richard Painter said that the former President could be blocked from running again in 2024, due to his activities associated with the January 6, 2021 attack on the Capitol.

The memos are undated. The first memo was prepared in late 2020 following a December 24, 2020 request by a Trump aide. The second and longer memo was likely prepared in early 2021 as it cites a December 31, 2020 court filing.

First memorandum 
The first memo described the constitutional and statutory process for opening and counting of electoral votes under the Twelfth Amendment and Electoral Count Act, alleging that the Electoral Count Act was unconstitutional. The memo further claimed that the Vice President, who also serves as President of the Senate and presides over the joint session of Congress, "does the counting, including the resolution of disputed electoral votes... and all the Members of Congress can do is watch." The memo refers to the actions of John Adams and Thomas Jefferson during the presidential elections of 1796 and 1800 as evidence for this claim; some supporters of President Trump, such as Congressman Louie Gohmert, had falsely claimed that Jefferson's counting of Georgia's electoral votes in 1800 indicated that the Vice President could unilaterally accept or reject electoral votes.

The memo then laid out a six-step plan for Pence to overturn Biden's election:

Second memorandum 
The second memo laid out a more extensive plan with multiple scenarios for Pence to take to overturn Biden's election: The first section outlined fictional illegal conduct by election officials in six states (Arizona, Georgia, Michigan, Nevada, Pennsylvania, Wisconsin). The second section again alleged that the Electoral Count Act was unconstitutional, and that Pence had the power to unilaterally accept or reject electoral votes. The third section referred to "7 states" and outlined various alternatives for Pence to take to overturn Biden's election:

Rejection by Vice President Pence 
Gregory Jacob, chief legal counsel to then Vice President Pence, wrote a memo on December 8, 2020 to the vice-president regarding the January 6th Process for Elector Vote Count, outlining the constitutional issues at stake in the Twelfth Amendment and the Electoral Count Act of 1887.

The Jacob memo provided a basis for Vice President Mike Pence's deferral on January 6 to the U.S. Constitution and to the States, in opposition to the direct request from a sitting president.

The Trump administration's Attorney General William Barr rejected the legal theory presented in the Eastman memos, submitting his resignation on December 14. In an interview, Barr stated that Eastman's claim that Pence could change things was "crazy," but that "there's nothing inherently wrong with naming an alternative slate of electors".

Further legal analysis 
On September 27, 2021, Laurence Tribe, American legal scholar and University Professor Emeritus of Constitutional Law at Harvard University, and colleagues, fully described the legal background of the attempt to overturn the 2020 election, as well as possible ways of averting the use of such a legal strategy or similar approach in the future.

The Eastman memos have been described as an instruction manual for a coup d'état.

Disciplinary action 
In October 2021, serious complaints that could lead to disbarment were officially submitted against Eastman and related attorney Jeffrey Clark regarding their conduct in attempting to overturn the 2020 election. In March 2022, the State Bar of California confirmed that it had been investigating Eastman since September 2021. Also in March 2022, Reuters reported that two U.S. Justice Department officials, Jeffrey A. Rosen and Richard Donoghue, had cooperated with the D.C. Bar's Office of Disciplinary Counsel in its investigation of Jeffrey Clark's possible misconduct in his alleged efforts to help Trump overturn the results of the 2020 election.

See also 
 
 Ginni Thomas' efforts to overturn the 2020 presidential election
 Jeffrey Clark letter
 Newburgh Conspiracy – an attempt to overthrow the Continental Congress
 Public hearings of the United States House Select Committee on the January 6 Attack

References

External links 
 Video (4:48) – John Eastman Defends Trying To Overturn 2020 Election (MSNBC; October 27, 2021)

2020 documents
2020 United States presidential election
Articles containing video clips
Controversies of the 2020 United States presidential election
Trump administration controversies